Estradiol 17β-sulfate is an estrogen conjugate which is produced from estradiol by sulfation of the C17β hydroxyl group by estrogen sulfotransferases.

See also
 Estradiol 3-sulfate

References

Estradiol esters
Human metabolites
Phenols
Sulfate esters